The 1989 LSU Tigers football team represented Louisiana State University in the 1989 NCAA Division I-A football season.  The Tigers played their home games at Tiger Stadium in Baton Rouge, Louisiana.

Schedule

Roster

References

LSU
LSU Tigers football seasons
LSU Tigers football